Gacería is the name of a slang or argot employed by the  (or makers of the , or threshing-board, as well as threshing-sledge) and the  (or makers of : metathesis of Spanish word  sieve) in the village of Cantalejo, in the Spanish province of Segovia. Gacería incorporated Galician, French, Basque and Arabic words into its vocabulary, a linguistic practice employed by other traveling professional groups of Castile. Users of Gacería also incorporated words from Caló (Spanish Romani), Germanic languages and Catalan.

These trade routes did not usually extend into the Basque Country or Valencia, but words from these foreign lexicons were incorporated for their foreignness.

Its vocabulary arose amongst those involved in the industry of manufacturing farm implements in the village (yokes, wagons, footstools; and the threshing-board, a wooden tool resembling a sledge, with his bottom-side holding many lithic flakes that cuts the pile of cereal crop, in order to separate the grain of the rest of the plant: threshing.) The argot was thus used by the itinerant salesmen of these products, in opposition to settled villagers. In the face of mechanized agriculture, Gacería has survived amongst those who still sell such ancient farm implements as collectors' items.

The mechanics of Gacería
The vocabulary comprises some 353 words, with pronunciation following the phonetic rules of the Spanish language. The small vocabulary served those who used it, as only a handful of words from the argot were required for specific occasions, without the need for long speeches or paragraphs. Tracing its evolution or performing any lexicographical work is difficult, as Gacería employed words that either changed in meaning or were replaced by new words over time. Most of these 353 known words are nouns; there are some 40 verbs.

Some words were formed through the process of metathesis. Other words were formed through aphesis (from "apanar" was derived ; from "otana," ). In Castilian,  carries the meaning of "daring" or "impudent" as an adjective, and "daredevil" or "smart aleck" as a noun.   

Gesticulation also plays a large part in giving added meaning to words from Gacería, as one word could potentially have many meanings. "In Gacería eyes speak more than words," one scholar has written. "A simple gesture is enough to change the meaning of a word."

Some words from Gacería

Sources

 Gacería
 Vocabulario de la Gacería
 Online Gacería-Castilian Dictionary

See also
Barallete
Bron
Cant
fala dos arxinas

Spanish culture
Cant languages
Province of Segovia
Cants with Basque influence
Spanish language
Occupational cryptolects
Threshing tools